Frank Yates FRS (12 May 1902 – 17 June 1994) was one of the pioneers of 20th-century statistics.

Biography
Yates was born in Manchester, England, the eldest of five children (and only son) of seed merchant Percy Yates and his wife Edith. He attended Wadham House, a private school, before gaining a scholarship to Clifton College in 1916. In 1920 he obtained a scholarship at St John's College, Cambridge, and four years later graduated with a First Class Honours degree.

He spent two years teaching mathematics to secondary school pupils at Malvern College before heading to Africa where he was mathematical advisor on the Gold Coast Survey. He returned to England due to ill health and met and married a chemist, Margaret Forsythe Marsden, the daughter of a civil servant.  This marriage was dissolved in 1933 and he later married  Prascovie (Pauline) Tchitchkine, previously the partner of Alexis Tchitchkine. After her death in 1976, he married Ruth Hunt, his long-time secretary.

In 1931 Yates was appointed assistant statistician at Rothamsted Experimental Station by R.A. Fisher. In 1933 he became head of statistics when Fisher  went to University College London. At Rothamsted he worked on the design of experiments, including contributions to the theory of analysis of variance and originating Yates's algorithm and the balanced incomplete block design.

During World War II he worked on what would later be called operations research.

After WWII, he worked on sample survey design and analysis. He became an enthusiast of electronic computers, in 1954 obtaining an Elliott 401 for Rothamsted and contributing to the initial development of statistical computing. During 1960–61, he was President of the British Computer Society, succeeding the founding president and computer pioneer, Maurice Wilkes. In 1960, he was awarded the Guy Medal in Gold of the Royal Statistical Society and, in 1966, he was awarded the Royal Medal of the Royal Society. He retired from Rothamsted to become a senior research fellow at Imperial College London. He died in 1994, aged 92, in Harpenden.

Selected publications
The design and analysis of factorial experiments, Technical Communication no. 35 of the Commonwealth Bureau of Soils (1937) (alternatively attributed to the Imperial Bureau of Soil Science).
Statistical tables for biological, agricultural and medical research (1938, coauthor R.A. Fisher): sixth edition, 1963
Sampling methods for censuses and surveys (1949)
 Computer programs GENFAC, RGSP, Fitquan.

See also
 Yates analysis
 Yates's correction for continuity
 Fisher–Yates shuffle

References

1902 births
1994 deaths
People educated at Clifton College
Alumni of St John's College, Cambridge
English statisticians
Survey methodologists
20th-century English mathematicians
Academics of Imperial College London
British operations researchers
Scientists from Manchester
Fellows of the Royal Society
Presidents of the Royal Statistical Society
Presidents of the British Computer Society
Royal Medal winners
Rothamsted statisticians
Mathematical statisticians